Óscar Lozano Folgoso (born 14 June 1996) is a Spanish footballer who plays as a right winger for CD El Ejido.

Club career
Born in Motril, Granada, Andalusia, Lozano finished his formation with CD Santa Fe. In June 2015 he signed for Tercera División side Loja CD, and made his senior debut on 22 August of that year by starting in a 1–0 home win against CD El Palo.

Lozano scored his first senior goals on 1 November 2015, netting a brace in a 3–2 home win against Martos CD. After finishing the season as an undisputed starter, he signed for Córdoba CF the following 28 June, being initially assigned to the reserves in the Segunda División B.

On 4 January 2017, after being sparingly used, Lozano terminated his contract and signed for CF Motril of the fourth tier. In July he moved to another reserve team, UD Almería B, in the same division.

Lozano made his first-team debut on 22 December 2017, coming on as a second-half substitute for Pervis Estupiñán in a 0–2 away loss against AD Alcorcón in the Segunda División. On 11 April 2019, he joined third division side SD Ponferradina as a replacement for the injured Guille Donoso, and helped the side to achieve promotion to the second division in the play-offs.

On 7 August 2019, Lozano joined CD El Ejido of division four.

References

External links

1996 births
Living people
People from Motril
Sportspeople from the Province of Granada
Spanish footballers
Footballers from Andalusia
Association football wingers
Segunda División players
Segunda División B players
Tercera División players
Córdoba CF B players
UD Almería B players
UD Almería players
SD Ponferradina players
Loja CD players